Torvak the Warrior is a hack and slash platform game published by Core Design in 1990 for the Amiga and Atari ST. The gameplay has similarities to Rastan.

Gameplay

Reception

References

External links
Torvak the Warrior at Amiga Hall of Light
Torvak the Warrior at Atari Mania

1990 video games
Amiga games
Atari ST games
Core Design games
Video games developed in the United Kingdom
Video games scored by Matt Furniss